Baldwin Hotel was a 19th-century luxury hotel and theatre built by Comstock Lode millionaire, entrepreneur, and gambler Elias Jackson "Lucky" Baldwin, formerly in downtown San Francisco, California. It was located on Powell Street at the corner of Market Street, near the Union Square area.

History
The Baldwin Theatre was completed in 1875, and the Baldwin Hotel was completed around it in 1876. The hotel was designed in the Second Empire style by architect Sumner Bugbee.

The theatre featured touring performers and it was first known as Baldwin's Academy of Music. Most of the touring performers of the day appeared there. The hotel and theatre occupied the entire block. The ground floor was divided into a number of large stores.

A theatre attendee, Mrs. Frank Leslie, described the building in 1877:

Destruction
The entire building was destroyed by fire in 1898.  Two people were killed, and the adjacent Columbia Theater building on Powell Street suffered considerable damage. After the Baldwin Hotel building was demolished, the Flood Building was built on the site in 1904.

References

External links

 Gendisasters.com: Baldwin Hotel Block Destroyed, Nov 1898, San Francisco, CA — narrative accounts
Hotels in San Francisco
Theatres in the San Francisco Bay Area
Market Street (San Francisco)
Union Square, San Francisco
Hotel buildings completed in 1876
Theatres completed in 1875
Defunct hotels in California
Demolished hotels in California
Demolished theatres in California
Former buildings and structures in San Francisco
1875 establishments in California
Hotels established in 1876
1876 establishments in California
1898 disestablishments in California
19th century in San Francisco
Second Empire architecture in California